Eva Dawes (later Spinks, September 17, 1912 – May 30, 2009) is a Canadian athlete who competed mainly in the high jump. She was born in Toronto.

She competed for Canada in the 1932 Summer Olympics held in Los Angeles, United States in the high jump where she won the bronze medal. She also qualified for both the 1928 Summer Olympics but was, at 15, too young to go, and the 1936 Summer Olympics which she chose to boycott because they were held in Nazi Germany.

At the 1934 Empire Games she won the silver medal in the high jump competition.

Dawes moved to England in 1937 and married Arthur Spinks. She lived in London until moving to Thames Ditton in 1969. She lived in the St. Helens retirement home from 2003 until her death.

On 19 March 2000 Eva attended the book launch of 'A Proper Spectacle - Women Olympians 1900 - 1936' with other sportswomen from the 1920s and 1930s. She died on May 30, 2009, two weeks after a stroke.

References

External links
 sports-reference.com

1912 births
2009 deaths
Athletes from Toronto
Canadian female high jumpers
Olympic track and field athletes of Canada
Athletes (track and field) at the 1932 Summer Olympics
Olympic bronze medalists for Canada
Athletes (track and field) at the 1934 British Empire Games
Commonwealth Games silver medallists for Canada
Commonwealth Games medallists in athletics
Medalists at the 1932 Summer Olympics
Olympic bronze medalists in athletics (track and field)
Medallists at the 1934 British Empire Games